Ileana River may refer to the following rivers in Romania:

 Ileana, a tributary of the Bahlui in Iași County
 Ileana, another name for the Râiosu River (Câlniștea), a tributary of the Câlniștea in Giurgiu County